Rasim Öztekin (14 January 1959 – 8 March 2021) was a Turkish actor. He appeared in more than forty films since 1985.

Death 
Öztekin died of a heart attack on 8 March 2021 in Istanbul at the age of 62. He was buried at Zincirlikuyu Cemetery.

Selected filmography

References

External links 

1959 births
2021 deaths
Turkish male film actors
Male actors from Istanbul
Burials at Zincirlikuyu Cemetery